Snake Mountain is a mountain located along the border between North Carolina and Tennessee, east of the community of Zionville, in the southeastern United States. It is part of the Blue Ridge Mountains, and includes parts of Watauga County, North Carolina, and Johnson County, Tennessee.

The mountain generates several feeder streams to the North Fork New River (via Maine Branch), South Fork New River (via Meat Camp Creek) and Watauga River (via Cove Creek).  Several ridges form from Snake Mountain, with the main being Snake Mountain Ridge, which marks the border between North Carolina and Tennessee; also there is Sugartree Ridge and Hessian Ridge, which are smaller outcrops from Snake Mountain, to its west.  Several gaps also surround the mountain:  Elk Horn Gap, Pottertown Gap, Rich Mountain Gap and State Line Gap.

Historically, both the Old Buffalo Trail and Daniel Boone Trail converge at the foot of the mountain, at Zionville.

References

Mountains of North Carolina
Mountains of Tennessee
Landforms of Johnson County, Tennessee
Mountains of Watauga County, North Carolina